The Rozendal cabinet was the 9th cabinet of the Netherlands Antilles.

Composition
The cabinet was composed as follows:

|Minister of General Affairs
|Sylvius Gerard Marie Rozendal
|DP
|14 October 1977
|-
|Minister of Social Welfare, Youth Affairs, Sports, Culture and Recreation
|Stanley N. Rogers
||DP
|31 October 1977
|-
|Minister of Justice
|Leo A.I. Chance
|PPA
|14 October 1977
|-
|Minister of Finance
|Max Croes
|PPA
|14 October 1977
|-
|Minister of Education
|Faustina M. Frank
|PPA
|14 October 1977
|-
|-
|Minister of Economic Affairs
|Maurits J. Larmonie
|PNP
|19 October 1977
|-
|Minister of Social Affairs and Labor
|Hubert L. Spencer
|DP
|14 October 1977
|-
|Minister of Welfare
|Miguel A. Pourier
|UPB
|14 October 1977
|-
|Minister of Traffic and Communications
|Alfredo R. Winklaar
|PNP
|19 October 1977
|-
|Minister of Public Health
|Gualberto Hernandez
|DP
|14 October 1977
|}

References

Cabinets of the Netherlands Antilles
1977 establishments in the Netherlands Antilles
Cabinets established in 1977
Cabinets disestablished in 1979
1979 disestablishments in the Netherlands Antilles